Albrechtice nad Orlicí is a municipality and village in Rychnov nad Kněžnou District in the Hradec Králové Region of the Czech Republic. It has about 1,000 inhabitants.

Geography
It lies in the Orlice Table. It is situated on the left bank of the Orlice River.

History
The first written mention of Albrechtice is from 1279. Between 1346 and 1378, the village was promoted to a market town. In 1495, it was acquired by Vilém II of Pernštejn. During the rule of the Pernštejn family, Albrechtice lost its significance and the title of a market town.

Sights
The landmark of Albrechtice nad Orlicí is the Church of Saint John the Baptist. It was originally a Gothic church.

Notable people
Josef Peukert (1855–1910), anarchist

Twin towns - sister cities

Albrechtice nad Orlicí is twinned with:
 Wörgl, Austria

References

External links

 

Villages in Rychnov nad Kněžnou District